Twilight for the Gods is a 1958 American Eastmancolor adventure film directed by Joseph Pevney and starring Rock Hudson and Cyd Charisse. The story is based on the novel Twilight for the Gods by Ernest K. Gann (though the opening credits read "Written by Ernest K. Gann," implying it is an original screenplay rather than an adaptation). An underlying current in the book is about sailing ships with their long histories being replaced by modern steamers, which is what the title refers to—the end of an era for the square-sailed ships.

Plot
After being court-martialed and discharged from the Navy, Captain Bell (Rock Hudson) turns to drink. Reduced to skippering a rundown brigantine in the South Seas, he takes on board a disparate group of passengers and crew, including a prostitute, a show-biz entrepreneur, a missionary, a washed up opera singer, a couple of refugees, and a load of copra bound for Mexico.  The ship springs a leak during a storm, and the true characters of all on board are revealed as the ship tries to make port in Honolulu before it sinks.

Cast
Rock Hudson as Capt. David Bell
Cyd Charisse as Mrs. Charlotte King aka Inez Leidstrom 
Arthur Kennedy as First Mate Ramsay
Leif Erickson as Harry Hutton, theatrical manager
Charles McGraw as Yancy
Ernest Truex as Reverend Butterfield, missionary
Richard Haydn as Oliver Wiggins, British playboy
Judith Evelyn as Ethel Peacock, vocalist with Hutton
Wallace Ford as Old Brown, shipmate
Vladimir Sokoloff as Feodor Morris, emigrant
Celia Lovsky as Ida Morris, emigrant
Robert Hoy as Keim
Charles Horvath as Lott
Maurice Marsac as Shipping clerk
Virginia Gregg as Myra Pringle

References

External links

1958 films
1958 drama films
American drama films
Films based on American novels
Films directed by Joseph Pevney
Films scored by David Raksin
Seafaring films
Universal Pictures films
1950s English-language films
1950s American films